Leave It Open is the fifth studio album by Pierre Moerlen's Gong. It was released in 1981.

Featuring an all-instrumental jazz-driven sound, notable for the prominent use of vibraphone, it has little to do with the psychedelic space rock of Daevid Allen's Gong, even though the two bands share a common history.

The album features the American jazz saxophonist Charlie Mariano, the band's only album to do so, and was their last release for a major label.

Track listing

Personnel
Pierre Moerlen's Gong
 Pierre Moerlen – drums, vibraphone, gong, keyboards, synthesizer bass, rhythm guitar
 Hansford Rowe – bass, rhythm guitar
 Bon Lozaga – guitar
 François Causse – percussion, drums
Guest musicians
 Charlie Mariano – saxophone (1, 2, 3, 4)
 Demelza – congas (1)
 Brian Holloway – rhythm guitar (2)

Production credits
 Nick Bradford – assistant
 Gordon Johnson – assistant
 Ian Jones – assistant
 Graham Lawson – executive producer	
 Keith Moore – assistant
 Sheila Rock – photography

References

 Macan, E. L., Macan, E. (1997). Rocking the Classics: English Progressive Rock and the Counterculture. Germany: Oxford University Press. p. 243
 https://www.allmusic.com/album/leave-it-open-mw0000447018

1981 albums
Gong (band) albums
Pierre Moerlen's Gong albums
Arista Records albums